Teupasenti is a municipality in the Honduran department of El Paraiso

Municipalities of the El Paraíso Department